Decline and Fall of the American Programmer is a book written by Edward Yourdon in 1992. It was addressed to American programmers and software organizations of the 1990s, warning that they were about to be driven out of business by programmers in other countries who could produce software more cheaply and with higher quality. Yourdon claimed that American software organizations could only retain their edge by using technologies such as ones he described in the book. (These are listed in the chapter outline below.) Yourdon gave examples of how non-American—specifically Indian and Japanese—companies were making use of these technologies to produce high-quality software.

In the follow-up book Rise and Resurrection of the American Programmer, published in 1996, Yourdon reversed some of his original predictions based upon changes in the state of the software industry.

Chapter outline
1. Introduction
2. The Lure of the Silver Bullet
3. Peopleware
4. Software Processes
5. Software Methodologies
6. CASE
7. Software Metrics
8. Software Quality Assurance
9. Software Reusability
10. Software Re-Engineering
11. Future Trends
A. Software Technology in India
B. The Programmer's Bookshelf

Release details
 Prentice Hall, 1992; hardback
 Prentice Hall, June 16, 1993; paperback

See also
The History of the Decline and Fall of the Roman Empire, to which this book's title is a reference
Peopleware, by Tom DeMarco and Timothy Lister

1992 non-fiction books
Software development books
Software quality
Software industry
Science and technology in the United States
Prentice Hall books